Cycas falcata is a little-known species of cycad endemic to Indonesia. It is found in Southeast Sulawesi and Kabaena Island.

References

falcata